G&W may refer to:
Game & Watch, handheld electronic games produced by Nintendo
Genesee and Wyoming Railroad
Genesee & Wyoming
Grote & Weigel, American meat company
Gulf+Western